Radical 82 or radical fur meaning "fur" is one of the 34 Kangxi radicals (214 radicals in total) composed of 4 strokes.

In the Kangxi Dictionary, there are 211 characters (out of 49,030) to be found under this radical.

 is also the 82nd indexing component in the Table of Indexing Chinese Character Components predominantly adopted by Simplified Chinese dictionaries published in mainland China.

The character is a Chinese family name, and often refers to the Chinese leader Mao Zedong.

Evolution

Derived characters

Literature

External links

Unihan Database - U+6BDB

082
082